Team Todenhöfer – The Justice Party is a political party in Germany, founded in 2020 by former Christian Democratic Union politician Jürgen Todenhöfer. The party opposes foreign missions by the Bundeswehr, proposes two-term limits for the Bundestag and government ministers, and supports the reduction of the public service and cutting taxes.

Todenhöfer terminated his CDU membership and launched the party on 12 November 2020, his eightieth birthday. Team Todenhöfer ran in the federal election as well as state elections in Berlin and Mecklenburg-Vorpommern, all of which took place on 26 September 2021. Ahead of the elections, Todenhöfer declared himself Chancellor candidate and claimed that his party had "the youngest candidate list and the highest proportion of women". Der Spiegel classified Team Todenhöfer as a minor populist party.

Team Todenhöfer received support from organisations associated with the ruling Justice and Development Party (AKP) of Turkey, including the Turkish Radio and Television Corporation and the pro-Erdoğan German political party the Alliance for Innovation and Justice (BIG).

Team Todenhöfer ran in fifteen out of sixteen states in the federal election, and was the twelfth most-popular overall, winning 214,535 votes (0.5%) and no seats.

References

Political parties in Germany
Political parties established in 2020
Anti-militarism in Europe
2020 establishments in Germany